The men's 1000 meter at the 2016 KNSB Dutch Single Distance Championships took place in Heerenveen at the Thialf ice skating rink on Tuesday 29 December 2015. There were 20 participants.

Statistics

Result

Source:

Referee: Jan Bolt. Starter: Raymond Micka 
Start: 17:13 hr.  Finish: 17:41 hr

Draw

References

Single Distance Championships
2016 Single Distance